George Cadogan (1814–1880) was a British Army general.

George Cadogan may also refer to:

George Cadogan, 3rd Earl Cadogan (1783–1864), British Royal Navy officer and politician
George Cadogan, 5th Earl Cadogan (1840–1915), British politician